Events from the year 1842 in Canada.

Incumbents
Monarch: Victoria

Federal government
Parliament: 1st

Governors
Governor General of the Province of Canada: Charles Poulett Thomson, 1st Baron Sydenham
Governor of New Brunswick: William MacBean George Colebrooke
Governor of Nova Scotia: Lucius Cary, 10th Viscount Falkland
Civil Governor of Newfoundland: John Harvey
Governor of Prince Edward Island: Henry Vere Huntley
Governor of Canada West: Richard Downes Jackson

Premiers
Joint Premiers of the Province of Canada —
William Henry Draper, Canada West Premier
Samuel Harrison, Canada East Premier

Events
January 10 – Governor General of Canada Sir Charles Bagot arrives at Kingston, Ontario.
January 12 – The Islander is founded  Charlottetown, Prince Edward Island
August 9 – The Webster–Ashburton Treaty ends the Aroostook War, settling once and for all the Maine–New Brunswick border dispute.
October 16 – Queen's University is founded
The first Railway in Nova Scotia is begun.

Full date unknown
1842 Newfoundland general election
Cornish emigrants begin to arrive in the area of Bruce Mines

Births
January 1 – John Morison Gibson, politician and Lieutenant Governor of Ontario (died 1929)
March 4 – Hector Berthelot, lawyer, journalist and publisher (died 1895)
June 26 – Zoé Lafontaine, wife of Sir Wilfrid Laurier, 7th Prime Minister of Canada (died 1921)
June 30 – William Smithe, politician and 6th Premier of British Columbia (died 1887)
July 11 – Louis-Philippe Turcotte, historian (died 1878)
August 14 – Malcolm Alexander MacLean, 1st Mayor of Vancouver (died 1895)
August 15 – Judson Burpee Black, physician and politician (died 1924)
September 9 – Silas Tertius Rand Bill, politician, merchant and shipowner (died 1890)
December 15 – Neil McLeod, lawyer, judge, politician and Premier of Prince Edward Island (died 1915)
December 28 – Calixa Lavallée, musician and composer (died 1891)

Full date unknown
Pitikwahanapiwiyin, Cree chief (died 1886)
Jean Baptiste Blanchet, politician (died 1904)
Arthur Boyle, politician (died 1919)
Thomas Scott, Orangemen (died 1870)

Deaths

References 

 
Canada
Years of the 19th century in Canada
1842 in North America